DYCP (90.3 FM), branded as 90.3 XStream FM, is a radio station owned by Southern Broadcasting Network and operated by Y2H Broadcasting Network, Inc. The station's studio and transmitter are located at Room 203, Capitol Subd. Bldg., along Lacson cor. 15th Sts.,  Bacolod City.

History
 First broadcast in 1993 as DYCP 90.3.
 In 2001 the station rebranded as Music Now with a Top 40 format.
 In late 2003, the station became Mom's Radio 90.3. Dedicated to the mothers and mother-to-be listeners in Bacolod.
 In 2010, it reverted to DYCP 90.3 with limited broadcast time.
 In November 2015, Mom's Radio 90.3 returned on air, this time via satellite from Manila.
 In February 2018, Mom's Radio stations went off the air due to financial constraints.
 In November 2022, shortly after Y2H Broadcasting Network took over its operations, the station returned to the air as XStream FM, airing a mass-based music format to complement its forthcoming sister station 96.7 XFM (which runs a hybrid news & music format). Official launching will be held at a later date.

References

Southern Broadcasting Network
Radio stations in Bacolod
Radio stations established in 1993
Radio stations disestablished in 2018
Defunct radio stations in the Philippines